No. 616 (South Yorkshire) Squadron is an active Reserve unit of the  Royal Auxiliary Air Force (RAuxAF) assigned to the RAF ISTAR Force at RAF Waddington. It was originally formed as a unit of the British Auxiliary Air Force in 1938, active throughout World War 2 as a fighter unit, becoming the 1st operational RAF unit to fly jets and disbanded in 1957. The unit reformed in its current guise in April 2019 as 616 (South Yorkshire) Squadron Royal Auxiliary Air Force.

History and Operations

Formation
No. 616 Squadron was formed on 1 November 1938 at RAF Doncaster and was at first allotted the bomber role, receiving Hawker Hinds for that role. The role soon changed however and the squadron's first operational fighter aircraft were Gloster Gauntlet biplane fighters received in January 1939. Fairey Battle monoplane light bombers were delivered in May 1939 for training duties to assist the squadron in preparing for re-equipment with Supermarine Spitfire Mk.Is in October 1939. During that month No. 616 moved to RAF Leconfield and by the end of November conversion to the modern fighter was complete.

The squadron's first operational sorties were over the Dunkirk withdrawal in late May 1940. During the first phase of the Battle of Britain No. 616 was based at Leconfield, moving south to RAF Kenley on 19 August to be nearer the front line.
The improved Spitfire Mk.II was received in February 1941 and was used from April on sweeps over occupied France from RAF Tangmere, continuing until October. Further periodic updating with Spitfire Mks.V, VI and VII continued through the mid-war years. From March 1943 onwards, No. 616 was stationed in southwest England.

First on Meteors

On 12 July 1944 the unit became the first RAF squadron to receive jet equipment in the form of Gloster Meteor Mk.I fighters, testing them at RAF Culmhead. The first Meteor operational sortie was on 27 July from RAF Manston when it intercepted V-1 flying bombs launched against southern England. The first victories came on 4 August when one V1 was tipped over after a pilot's cannon jammed and another was shot down. The loss rate of the still unproven Meteor Mk.I was high, with three being written off in non-combat incidents between 15 and 29 August. Re-equipment with improved Meteor Mk.IIIs began in January 1945 and in February a detachment was deployed to Melsbroek near Brussels in Belgium. It was intended as a defence against Me 262s but in the event they did not ever face them. In early April the complete squadron moved to Gilze-Rijen in the Netherlands, commencing ground attack sorties on 16 April. The squadron was disbanded at Lübeck, Germany on 29 August 1945 by being renumbered to No. 263 Squadron RAF.

Post-war
No. 616 squadron was officially reformed at RAF Finningley as the South Yorkshire Squadron on 10 May 1946, with volunteers being recruited over the following few months till embodied on 11 July 1946. It was allocated the night fighter role within Reserve Command and the first Mosquito T.3 trainers were received in October, but it was not until January 1948 that the operational Mosquito NF.30s were delivered to Finningley.

At the end of 1948 No. 616 was redesignated as a day fighter squadron and began to receive Meteor F.3s in January 1949. Conversion to the updated Meteor F.8 took place in December 1951, which wore the distinctive Green and Gold Diamond markings of 616 Sqn on the rear fuselage. The squadron moved base to RAF Worksop on 23 May 1955, where it either disbanded on 10 March 1957 (per Halley and Jefford or Pitchfork), together with all RAuxAF flying units, or disbanded on 15 January 1957 according to Rawlings in Fighter Squadrons of the Royal Air Force, at RAF Finningley.

Re-Activation & Current Role
In April 2019, the unit reformed as 616 (South Yorkshire) Squadron Royal Auxiliary Air Force (RAuxAF) at RAF Waddington to augment the RAF’s Intelligence, Surveillance, Target Acquisition and Reconnaissance (ISTAR) Force and delivering a Combat Air capability.
Personnel assigned to 616 Sqn are former Regular RAF specialists, providing expertise, experience and mentoring to augment the RAF's Front Line ISTAR Squadrons.

Aircraft operated

Squadron bases

Commanding officers

Notable Members of 616 Squadron
Air Vice Marshal James Edgar 'Johnnie' Johnson CB CBE DSO & Two Bars DFC & Bar 
Group Captain Sir Hugh Dundas CBE DSO & Bar DFC
Group Captain Denys Gillam DSO & Two Bars DFC & Bar AFC
Group Captain Sir Douglas Bader CBE DSO & Bar DFC & Bar DL FRAeS

See also
List of Royal Air Force aircraft squadrons

References

Notes

Bibliography

External links

 Squadron histories for Nos. 611–620 Squadrons
 Squadron History 616 Sqn

616
Fighter squadrons of the Royal Air Force in World War II
RAF squadrons involved in the Battle of Britain
Military units and formations established in 1938